Kubeer is a Mandal in Nirmal district in the state of Telangana in India.

References 

Villages in Nirmal district
Mandal headquarters in Nirmal district